French History is a journal published by the Oxford University Press on behalf of The Society for the Study of French History.

Overview
It was founded in 1987 by Richard Bonney.

Its current editors are Malcolm Crook and Julian Wright

It is published four times a year (in March, June, September and December) and features articles covering the entire chronological range of French history.

See also
List of history journals

External links
French History at Oxford Journals
The Society for the Study of French History

Oxford University Press academic journals
Publications established in 1987
French history journals